Irina Izmalkova (born 21 June 1970) is a Russian sport shooter.

She participated at the 2018 ISSF World Shooting Championships, winning a medal.

References

External links

Living people
1970 births
Russian female sport shooters
Running target shooters
Sportspeople from Volgograd
21st-century Russian women